John Wood House may refer to:

John Wood Mansion, Quincy, Illinois, listed on the National Register of Historic Places (NRHP)
John Wood Farmstead, Milroy, Indiana, listed on the NRHP in Rush County, Indiana
John Wood House (Huntington Station, New York), NRHP-listed
John Howland Wood House, Bayside, Texas, listed on the NRHP in Refugio County, Texas